Robert G. Bottoms was President of DePauw University from 1986 to June 30, 2008; he retired with $1.2 million in compensation, with total compensation  in retirement totaling $2.3 million. He became president emeritus of the university and head of the new Janet Prindle Center for Ethics, serving until January 1, 2010.  During Bottoms' presidency, enrollment at DePauw increased, as did its standing in national college and university rankings. The university endowment increased from $83.2 million  to  $521.9 million during his presidency.

Education
Dr. Bottoms earned a bachelor's degree at Birmingham-Southern College, a bachelor of divinity degree at Emory University, and a PhD at Vanderbilt University.

Personal life
Dr. Bottoms is married to Gwen Vickers Bottoms; they have two children and four grandchildren.

References

Living people
Year of birth missing (living people)
People from Birmingham, Alabama
Presidents of DePauw University
Emory University alumni
Vanderbilt University alumni